October 25 - Eastern Orthodox liturgical calendar - October 27

All fixed commemorations below celebrated on November 8 by Eastern Orthodox Churches on the Old Calendar.

For October 26th, Orthodox Churches on the Old Calendar commemorate the Saints listed on October 13.

Saints

 Holy and Glorious Great-martyr Demetrius the Myrrh-gusher of Thessalonica (306)
 Martyr Lupus (Lypp), slave of St. Demetrius of Thessalonica (306) (see also: August 23)
 Martyrs Artemidorus and Basil, by the sword.
 Martyr Leptina, dragged to death.
 Martyr Glycon, by the sword.
 Martyr Leontini.
 Saint Athanasius of Medikion Monastery (814)

Pre-Schism Western saints

 Saint Evaristus, the fourth Pope of Rome and a martyr (c. 105)
 Saints Rogatian, a priest, and Felicissimus, a layman, of the church of Carthage in North Africa where they were martyred (256)
 Saint Rusticus of Narbonne, a monk of Lérins who later became Bishop of Narbonne, he was present at the Third Oecumenical Council in Ephesus in 431 (c. 462)
 Saints Alanus and Alorus, two Bishops of Quimper in Brittany (5th century)
 Saint Quadragesimus, a shepherd and subdeacon in Policastro in Italy who raised a man from the dead (c. 590)
 Saints Aneurin (or Gildas) and Gwinoc, father and son, both monks in Wales (6th century)
 Saint Gibitrudis, a nun at Faremoutiers-en-Brie in France (c. 655)
 Saint Cedd, Bishop of Lastingham (664)  (see also: January 7)
 Saint Eadfrith of Leominster (Edfrid, Eadfrid), a priest from Northumbria in England, he preached in Mercia and founded a monastery in Leominster (c. 675)
 Saint Eata of Hexham, Bishop of Hexham and Abbot of Lindisfarne (686)
 Saint Gaudiosus of Salerno, Bishop of Salerno in Italy, his relics were venerated in Naples (7th century)
 Saint Humbert, a monk at Fritzlar and Büraburg in Germany (7th or 8th century)
 Saint Sigibald, Bishop of Metz in France (c. 740)
 Saint Cuthbert of Canterbury, a monk at Lyminge in Kent in England, he became Bishop of Hereford in c. 736 and the twelfth Archbishop of Canterbury in c. 740 (760)
 Saint Albinus (Witta), Bishop of Buraburg in Hesse (c. 760)
 Saint Alfred the Great, King of Wessex and all Orthodox England who defeated the Danish invaders and ensured the growth of the Church in England (899)
 Saint Beóán of Mortlach (Bean), Bishop of Mortlach in Banff in Scotland, he later preached in Aberdeen (c. 1012) 
 Saint Adalgott, a monk at Einsiedeln and from 1012 Abbot of Dissentis, both of which monasteries are in Switzerland (1031)

Post-Schism Orthodox saints

 Venerable Demetrius of Tsilibinsk (14th century)
 Saint Theophilus of the Kiev Caves, Archbishop of Novgorod (1482)
 Venerable New Martyr Ioasaph, monk, of Mt. Athos, disciple of St. Niphon, Patriarch of Constantinople (1536)
 Venerable Saints Leontios and Leontios, of Mt. Athos.
 Saint Anthony, Bishop of Vologda (1588)
 Saint Demetrius of Basarabov in Bulgaria (1685)  (see also: October 27 )

Other commemorations

 Commemoration of the Great Earthquake at Constantinople in 740 (740)
 Translation of the holy icon (1149) of Great-martyr Demetrius the Myrrh-gusher of Thessalonica (306) from Thessaloniki to Constantinople.
 Translation of the relics (1971) of New Martyr George of Ioannina (1838)
 Repose of Hieroschemamonk Nilus of Kryuchi (1924)
 Repose of Elder Ignatius the Bulgarian, of Mt. Athos (1927)
 Repose of Matushka Olga (A’rrsamquq) Michael of Kwethluk, Alaska (1979)

Icon gallery

Notes

References

Sources
 October 26 / November 8. Orthodox Calendar (PRAVOSLAVIE.RU).
 November 8 / October 26. HOLY TRINITY RUSSIAN ORTHODOX CHURCH (A parish of the Patriarchate of Moscow).
 October 26. OCA - The Lives of the Saints.
 The Autonomous Orthodox Metropolia of Western Europe and the Americas (ROCOR). St. Hilarion Calendar of Saints for the year of our Lord 2004. St. Hilarion Press (Austin, TX). p. 80.
 The Twenty-Sixth Day of the Month of October. Orthodoxy in China.
 October 26. Latin Saints of the Orthodox Patriarchate of Rome.
 The Roman Martyrology. Transl. by the Archbishop of Baltimore. Last Edition, According to the Copy Printed at Rome in 1914. Revised Edition, with the Imprimatur of His Eminence Cardinal Gibbons. Baltimore: John Murphy Company, 1916. pp. 330–331.
 Rev. Richard Stanton. A Menology of England and Wales, or, Brief Memorials of the Ancient British and English Saints Arranged According to the Calendar, Together with the Martyrs of the 16th and 17th Centuries. London: Burns & Oates, 1892. pp. 514–516.
Greek Sources
 Great Synaxaristes:  26 ΟΚΤΩΒΡΙΟΥ. ΜΕΓΑΣ ΣΥΝΑΞΑΡΙΣΤΗΣ.
  Συναξαριστής. 26 Οκτωβρίου. ECCLESIA.GR. (H ΕΚΚΛΗΣΙΑ ΤΗΣ ΕΛΛΑΔΟΣ).
  26/10/2017. Ορθόδοξος Συναξαριστής. 
Russian Sources
  8 ноября (26 октября). Православная Энциклопедия под редакцией Патриарха Московского и всея Руси Кирилла (электронная версия). (Orthodox Encyclopedia - Pravenc.ru).
  26 октября по старому стилю / 8 ноября по новому стилю. Русская Православная Церковь - Православный церковный календарь на 2016 год.

October in the Eastern Orthodox calendar